Kafana is a distinct type of local bistro (or tavern), common in former Yugoslav countries and Albania, which primarily serves alcoholic beverages and coffee, and often also light snacks (meze) and other food. Many kafanas feature live music performances.

The concept of a social gathering place for men to drink alcoholic beverages and coffee originated in Ottoman Empire and spread to Southeast Europe during Ottoman rule, further evolving into the contemporary kafana.

Nomenclature and etymology 
This distinct type of establishment is known by several slightly differing names depending on country and language:

 Serbian (Cyrillic): , pl. 
 Croatian: , pl. 
 Macedonian: , pl. 
 Romanian: , pl. 
 Slovene: , pl. 

The word itself, irrespective of regional differences, is derived from the Turkish  'coffeehouse', which is in turn derived from the Persian term  (a compound of the Arabic  'coffee' and Persian  'house').

In Macedonia,  is sometimes confused with the more traditional , while the variant  (adopted from commercial Serbian folk-songs and popularized by domestic artists) may be used for the establishment described in this article; however, both terms are used interchangeably by some.

The Slovenian  shares neither its' etymology nor its' functionality with the Ottoman kahvehane, deriving instead from the coffeehouses of Vienna and thus not offering its' guests alcoholic beverages or entertainment in the form of folk music. The term 'kavarna' is of Slovenian origin, like related Slovene terms for shopping or drinking venues such as 'pekarna' (bakery) and 'gostilna' (tavern).

Nowadays in Serbia, the term  is similarly used to describe any informal eatery serving traditional cuisine, as well as some other classical kafana dishes like karađorđeva.

History 

The first coffeehouses in the area appeared during the Ottoman expansion in the 16th century, popping up in Belgrade, Buda, Sarajevo and other cities under Ottoman control. Further west, in Zagreb, the first coffee-serving establishments were recorded in 1636. The first known modern-day  in Zagreb was opened in 1749, and the institution was commonplace in Zagreb and many other Croatian cities by the end of the 18th century.

During the 18th and early 19th century, running a kafana (then usually called mehana) was a family business, a craft, passed on from generation to generation.

As the Balkan cities grew in size and became more urbanized, kafana also shifted its focus a bit. Some started serving food and offering other enticements to potential customers since owners now had to compete with other similar establishments around the city. Most bigger towns and cities in this period had a Gradska kafana (City kafana) located in or around main square where the most affluent and important individuals of that city would come to see and be seen. Prices in this particular kafana would usually be higher compared to others around the city that didn't enjoy the privilege of such an exclusive location.

The concept of live music was introduced in the early 20th century by kafana owners looking to offer different kinds of entertainment to their guests. Naturally, in the absence of mass media these bands strictly had a local character and would only play folk music that was popular within a particular region where the city lies.

As the 20th century rolled on, Balkan cities saw waves upon waves of rural population coming in, especially after World War II, and kafane diversified accordingly. Some continued to uphold a higher standard of service, while others began to cater to newly arrived rural population that mostly found employment in factories and on construction sites.

This is when the term kafana slowly began to be associated with something undesirable and suitable only for lower classes of society. By the 1980s, term kafana became almost an insult and most owners would steer clear of calling their places by that name, preferring westernized terms like restaurant, cafe, bistro, coffee bar, and so on, instead.

The stereotype 

It is not quite clear when the term kafana became instantly synonymous with decay, sloth, pain, backwardness, sorrow, etc. all across SFR Yugoslavia, but it is safe to say it happened in the 1970s or 1980s. Pop culture played a significant part in this transformation. Massively popular folk singers began to emerge, spurred on by the expansion of radio and television, often using kafana themes in their songs. Since the connection between commercial folk and rural regressiveness was already well established, kafana, too, got a dodgy rap by extension.

During the 1960s, in contrast to the state-sponsored Partisan films, Yugoslav movies of the Black Wave movement started depicting contemporary individuals from the margins of society. Run-down kafane would feature prominently in such stories. Socially relevant films like I Even Met Happy Gypsies, When Father Was Away on Business, Život je lep, Do You Remember Dolly Bell?, Specijalno vaspitanje, Kuduz, etc. all had memorable, dramatic scenes that take place in dilapidated rural or suburban kafana. Soon, a distinct cinematic stereotype appeared.

In Mate Bulić's album Gori borovina, there is a song "Ej, kavano", which describes the common stereotype of the kafana.

Social stereotype 
Kafana is stereotyped as a place where sad lovers cure their sorrows in alcohol and music, gamblers squander entire fortunes, husbands run away from mean wives while shady businessmen, corrupt local politicians and petty criminals do business. As in many other societies, frequenting kafane is seen as a mainly male activity, and "honest" women dare only visit finer ones, usually in the company of men.

As mentioned, it is a very frequent motif of late-20th century commercial folk songs, perhaps the most famous being "I tebe sam sit kafano" (I'm Already Sick of You, Kafana) by Haris Džinović, "Kafana je moja sudbina" (Kafana is My Destiny) by Toma Zdravković, and the ubiquitous "Čaše lomim" (I'm Breaking Glasses), originally by Nezir Eminovski.

By country

Albania 

In 2016, Albania surpassed Spain by becoming the country with the most coffee houses per capita in the world. In fact, there are 654 coffee houses per 100,000 inhabitants in Albania, a country with only 2.5 million inhabitants. This is due to coffee houses closing down in Spain due to the economic crisis, and the fact that as many cafes open as they close in Albania. In addition, the fact that it was one of the easiest ways to make a living after the fall of communism in Albania, together with the country's Ottoman legacy further reinforce the strong dominance of coffee culture in Albania.

Bosnia and Herzegovina 

Probably the purest form of kafana can be found in Bosnia where no food is served (differentiating kafana from ćevabdžinica, aščinica and buregdžinica), staying true to the original Turkish coffee and alcohol concept.

In Bosnian cities with large Muslim populations, one can still find certain old kafane that probably didn't look much different back when the Ottomans ruled Bosnia. They are now mostly frequented by local elders as well as the occasional tourist, and their numbers are dwindling.

Most of the old centerpiece Gradske Kafane have been visually modernized and had their names changed in the process to something snappy and western-sounding. Most other establishments that offer similar fare target a younger crowd and prefer not to use the term kafana. However, stereotypical kafanas hold some popularity amongst high-schoolers and students, as well as working-class men, who frequent them as places to binge drink due to their affordable prices.

Croatia 
In Croatia, the term for kafana is kavana (as coffee is spelled kava in Croatian) and they differ widely between continental Croatia and the Dalmatian coast. Kafić (pl. kafići) is a more general term encompassing all establishments serving coffee and alcohol drinks only, while kavana is the name for distinctly styled bistros described in this article.

Macedonia 
Currently, there are 5,206 kafeani in the country. According to the State Statistical Office, there are 989 kafeani (19% of the total number) in the capital Skopje, 413 in Tetovo, 257 in Bitola, 244 in Gostivar, 206 in Kumanovo, 205 in Struga, 188 in Ohrid and 161 in Strumica.

Serbia 

City of Belgrade features many establishments equipped with extensive kitchens serving elaborate menus that are officially called restaurants yet most patrons refer to them as kafane.

According to some, the first kafana in Belgrade opened sometime after 1738, when the Ottomans recaptured the city from the Austrians. Its name was Crni orao (Black Eagle) and it was located in Dorćol neighbourhood, at the intersection of today's Kralja Petra and Dušanova streets. Its patrons were only served Turkish black coffee poured from silver ibrik into a fildžan as well as nargile.

The concept of eating in Serbian kafane was introduced in the 19th century when the menu consisted mostly of simply snacks, such as ćevapčići. The menus soon expanded as food became large part of the appeal of Belgrade kafane that originated in the 19th and early 20th century like the famous ″?″, Lipov lad (opened in 1928), and Tri lista duvana, as well as Skadarlija bohemian spots Tri šešira, Dva bela goluba, Šešir moj, Dva jelena, Zlatni bokal, and Ima dana. Another kafana that gained notoriety during the early 20th century was Zlatna moruna at the Zeleni Venac neighbourhood where Young Bosnia conspirators frequently gathered while plotting the June 1914 assassination of Austro-Hungarian archduke Franz Ferdinand. Certain kafane had their names preserved through the structures that succeeded them in the same location; Palace Albanija, built in 1940 in central Belgrade got its name from the kafana that used to be there from 1860 until 1936.

Post World War II period gave a rise in popularity to kafane like Šumatovac, Pod lipom, and Grmeč in Makedonska Street (nicknamed the 'Bermuda triangle'), Manjež, as well as later establishments like Madera, Kod Ive, and Klub književnika.

Even the traditionally upscale restaurant joints like Ruski car and Grčka Kraljica weren't above being referred to as kafana.

Things have somewhat changed, however, since approximately the 1970s with the influx of Western pop and media cultures taking root. Most of the younger Serbian crowd started to associate the term kafana with something archaic and passé so the owners of places that cater to them began avoiding it altogether. Terms such as "kafić", initially and later "kafe" began to be used more frequently. An example would be Zlatni papagaj in Belgrade, a kafić that opened in September 1979 and almost immediately became the main gathering point for the city's well-dressed youngsters from affluent families. Similarly in the mid-1980s, kafić called Nana in Senjak neighbourhood became a favourite tough guy and mobster hangout.

The trend of moving away from the term kafana continued into the 1990s, and early 2000s. With gentrification taking root in many parts of central Belgrade, these new establishments mostly stay away from traditionalism. Good examples of this would be the numerous watering holes that have sprung up over the last 15 years in Strahinjića Bana Street, such as Veprov dah, Ipanema, Kandahar, and Dorian Gray, or various new restaurants in downtown Belgrade — none of these places are referred to as kafane, either by their owners or by their patrons.

See also 

 Coffeehouse
 Kafenio, the Greek equivalent
 Coffee culture in former Yugoslavia

References

Further reading

External links 
  Kuda Večeras – portal o kafanama i restoranima u Beogradu
 Kafana Republic
 Inns Were the Soul of the City
 Kafane pred izumiranjem, Press, February 23, 2008
 Kafane pišu istoriju, B92, June 25, 2009
 Baš lična istorija beogradskih kafana: "Grgeč"; Blic blog, 5 February 2010
 Baš lična istorija beogradskih kafana: "Bermudski trougao", Blic blog, 12 February 2010
  Obecana Zemlja

Restaurants by type
Types of coffeehouses and cafés
Coffee culture
Yugoslav culture
Serbian culture
Bosniak culture
Croatian culture
Macedonian culture
Albanian culture